The Sri Revana Siddeshwara Institute of Technology  (SRSIT or SRS Tech) is a private engineering college in Bangalore, Karnataka, India affiliated with the Visvesvaraya Technological University, Belgaum. It was founded by Sri R. Krishnappa and is managed by the Revana Siddeshwara Edu Trust(R). A well-established, government-aided engineering college, SRSIT almost 10 km from Bangalore Airport. It starting with four engineering disciplines: Electronics and Communication, Computer Science, Civil Engineering, and Mechanical Engineering; the college offers other Masters courses in the same building. Initially only a Master of Business Administration (MBA) is being run.

Campus
Sri Revana Siddeshwara Institute of Technology's 20-acre campus contains the college blocks and an eco-friendly environment. The campus contains a canteen, hostel, workshop, sports ground and subject blocks.

Courses

Postgraduate
Master of Business Administration (MBA)

The MBA consists of eight permanent faculty members.

Undergraduate
Bachelor of Engineering (B.E.) 
Computer Science & Engineering
Mechanical Engineering
Electronics & Communication Engineering
Civil Engineering

The Information Science and Engineering program was discontinued.

Activities

Sparsh
Sparsh is the annual inter-collegiate fest hosted by the college on its campus, in March or April. Several literary, cultural, academic and musical events are held.

References 
http://www.srsect.edu.in/

External links
 Institute website

Engineering colleges in Bangalore
All India Council for Technical Education
Affiliates of Visvesvaraya Technological University
Educational institutions established in 1997
1997 establishments in Karnataka